WASP-103 is an F-type main-sequence star located 1,800 ± 100 light-years (550 ± 30 parsecs) away in the constellation Hercules. The star's concentration of heavy elements is similar to that of the Sun. WASP-103 is slightly younger than the Sun at 4 billion years. The star is too hot for star spots to form; instead, its surface is covered by numerous bright faculae. The chromospheric activity of the star is elevated due to interaction with the giant planet on a close-in orbit.

Planetary system
In 2014 one super-Jupiter planet, named WASP-103b, was discovered by the transit method. The planet is orbiting its host star in less than a day and may be close to the limit of tidal disruption. Orbital decay was not detected by 2020. In early 2022, the planet was popularized because of its shape similar to a potato.

The planetary atmosphere contains water, and possibly hydrogen cyanide, titanium(II) oxide, or sodium. The planet has an elevated carbon to oxygen molar fraction of 0.9, and may be a carbon planet.

References

Hercules (constellation)
F-type main-sequence stars
Planetary transit variables
Planetary systems with one confirmed planet
J16371556+0711000